Datuk Seri S. Augustine Paul (12 October 1944 – 2 January 2010) was a controversial Malaysian federal court judge known for presiding over the trials of Malaysian opposition leader and former Deputy Prime Minister Anwar Ibrahim for sodomy and corruption.

Career
Paul obtained his Barrister-at-Law from Inner Temple, England, began his career in 1971 as Federal Counsel at the Attorney-General’s Chambers and later as a magistrate in Ipoh, Perak. Before that, he also served as a Sessions Court judge in Temerloh, Pahang, Malacca and Penang and was chairman of a special committee on taxation before being appointed to the Kuala Lumpur High Court Bench in May 1998.

He was confirmed as a High Court judge for less than six months when he presided over Anwar Ibrahim's sodomy and corruption cases which started in November, 1998. Seven years later, in 2005 Augustine was appointed Federal Court judge and he had several months to go before retiring.

On 2 January 2010 Paul died at the Selayang Hospital at the age of 65 after suffering from chronic illness.

References

1944 births
2010 deaths
20th-century Malaysian judges
Malaysian people of Indian descent
21st-century Malaysian judges